Steven James Goss (born August 29, 1960) is an American former handball player who competed in the 1984 Summer Olympics and in the 1988 Summer Olympics.

References

1960 births
Living people
American male handball players
Olympic handball players of the United States
Handball players at the 1984 Summer Olympics
Handball players at the 1988 Summer Olympics
People from Castro Valley, California
Sportspeople from Castro Valley, California
Medalists at the 1987 Pan American Games
Pan American Games gold medalists for the United States
Pan American Games medalists in handball
20th-century American people